On the Loose is a 1985 Swedish film directed by Staffan Hildebrand and distributed by Föreningsfilmo AB. It stars Tomas Fryk and Carina Lindström and features appearances by rock 'n' roll singer Jerry Williams and the hard rock band Europe.

Plot
Peter works as a welder in his hometown Katrineholm, but dreams of getting a better job with more money. When Europe comes to Katrineholm to do a concert, Peter finds out that his girlfriend Nina had a relationship with the band's vocalist Joey Tempest many years ago. Peter thinks Nina wants to get back together with Joey, so he gets very jealous, gets drunk at the concert and goes berserk. The safety officer Frasse makes Peter realize he should pull himself together and go sort things out with Nina.

Cast
Tomas Fryk as Peter
Carina Lindström as Nina
Jerry Williams as Frasse
Europe as themselves:
Joey Tempest
John Norum
John Levén
Mic Michaeli
Ian Haugland
Thomas Erdtman as Europe's manager
Joakim Ramstedt as security guard
Frank Nietsch as security guard
Johnny Aland as Peter's co-worker
Henrik Nilsson as Peter's co-worker
Jan-Erik Piotrowski as Peter's co-worker
Stig Winblad as Peter's co-worker
Stefan Perzanowski as Peter's co-worker

Soundtrack

The soundtrack was written by Joey Tempest and featured the songs "Rock the Night", "On the Loose" and "Broken Dreams". It was released as an EP. A live performance of "Rock the Night" by Europe is shown in the film. The John Lennon song "Working Class Hero" is also featured in the film, as sung by Jerry Williams.

External links 
On the Loose at the Internet Movie Database

Swedish short films
1985 films
1980s Swedish-language films
1980s Swedish films
1985 short films